Can I Shine? is the fourth studio album by American rapper Sean T. It was released October 9, 2001 on Asphalt Music Group and was entirely produced by Sean T.

Track listing
"Beyond My Means" - 3:24 (Featuring Mississippi, Papoose)
"Lossing My Mind" - 3:34 (Featuring Carmen Santiago, M.O.G.)  
"Can I Shine?" - 3:57  
"Held Up" - 4:04  (Featuring JT the Bigga Figga, San Quinn) 
"Snitches" - 3:04 (Featuring Daz Dillinger, JT the Bigga Figga) 
"Gettin Paper" - 3:33 (Featuring M.O.G.)  
"All Night" - 3:47  
"Can't Waint Til I Get It" - 3:49  
"When I C U" - 4:17 (Featuring B-Legit) 
"Bruised Fruit" (Featuring Mississippi) - 3:29  
"Flip Shit" - 4:07  
"What U Wanna Do?" - 3:09  
"Ride or Die" - 3:04 (Featuring Outlawz, M.O.G.)  
"That N*gga" - 3:51  
"In Yo Look" - 3:52 (Featuring Spice 1, Crime Boss)  
"Gangsta" - 4:32  
"Definitions" - 4:11 (Featuring Guce, Biaje-re-akt, Papoose) 
"U Know" - 3:27  (Featuring Gonzoe)  
"Get Gone" - 4:11

2001 albums
Sean T albums